Leptataspis is a genus of froghoppers belonging to the family Cercopidae.

Species

 Leptataspis acuta Schmidt, 1910
 Leptataspis aglaie (Breddin, 1902)
 Leptataspis alahana Jacobi, 1921
 Leptataspis amoena Lallemand, 1928
 Leptataspis angulosa (Stål, 1869)
 Leptataspis apicata Lallemand, 1922
 Leptataspis bansaina Lallemand, 1927
 Leptataspis barda Schmidt, 1911
 Leptataspis beatifica Schmidt, 1911
 Leptataspis bipars (Walker, 1858)
 Leptataspis borneensis Schmidt, 1911
 Leptataspis briseis (Breddin, 1903)
 Leptataspis bukidnona Lallemand, 1923
 Leptataspis butuanensis Lallemand, 1923
 Leptataspis cambodjana Schmidt, 1911
 Leptataspis cassandra (Breddin, 1903)
 Leptataspis chloe Jacobi, 1921
 Leptataspis cincta Lallemand & Synave, 1955
 Leptataspis clio Jacobi, 1921
 Leptataspis collaris Lallemand, 1922
 Leptataspis concinna Lallemand, 1939
 Leptataspis concolor (Walker, 1851)
 Leptataspis costalis Schmidt, 1911
 Leptataspis cyclopiana Lallemand & Synave, 1955
 Leptataspis discolor (Boisduval, 1835)
 Leptataspis diversa Schmidt, 1927
 Leptataspis electa Lallemand, 1928
 Leptataspis elegantula Distant, 1914
 Leptataspis eurydice (Breddin, 1903)
 Leptataspis euterpe Jacobi, 1921
 Leptataspis flavomarginata Schmidt, 1927
 Leptataspis formosula Schmidt, 1911
 Leptataspis fornax Schmidt, 1911
 Leptataspis fortunata Schmidt, 1911
 Leptataspis fruhstorferi Schmidt, 1927
 Leptataspis fulviceps (Dallas, 1850)
 Leptataspis fulvicollis (Walker, 1851)
 Leptataspis fuscipennis (Le Peletier de Saint-Fargeau & Serville, 1825)
 Leptataspis guttatiformis Schmidt, 1911
 Leptataspis hecuba Distant, 1914
 Leptataspis helena (Breddin, 1903)
 Leptataspis hendersoni Lallemand, 1930
 Leptataspis horsfieldi (Distant, 1900)
 Leptataspis horvathi Jacobi, 1921
 Leptataspis impressa (Walker, 1870)
 Leptataspis inclusa (Walker, 1851)
 Leptataspis insularis Lallemand, 1927
 Leptataspis intermedia Schmidt, 1912
 Leptataspis kiangensis Lallemand, 1939
 Leptataspis latipennis (Jacobi, 1905)
 Leptataspis lemoulti Lallemand, 1956
 Leptataspis leonina (Distant, 1908)
 Leptataspis leoninella Schmidt, 1911
 Leptataspis lieftincki Lallemand, 1954
 Leptataspis limonias Jacobi, 1921
 Leptataspis lombokensis Jacobi, 1921
 Leptataspis longirostris Schmidt, 1911
 Leptataspis lutea Schmidt, 1911
 Leptataspis lydia (Stål, 1865)
 Leptataspis maheensis Lallemand, 1922
 Leptataspis malaisei Lallemand, 1954
 Leptataspis martha (Lallemand, 1911)
 Leptataspis masoni (Distant, 1879)
 Leptataspis matherana Lallemand, 1939
 Leptataspis medanensis Lallemand, 1923
 Leptataspis medea Breddin, 1903
 Leptataspis moorei (Distant, 1878)
 Leptataspis moultoni Lallemand, 1923
 Leptataspis muiri Lallemand, 1956
 Leptataspis murina Schmidt, 1910
 Leptataspis nigripennis (Fabricius, 1803)
 Leptataspis nigrolimbata Schmidt, 1910
 Leptataspis novaeguineae Lallemand, 1922
 Leptataspis ophir (Distant, 1900)
 Leptataspis ophirina Lallemand, 1930
 Leptataspis ornata Lallemand, 1939
 Leptataspis palawana Schmidt, 1911
 Leptataspis papua (Jacobi, 1905)
 Leptataspis papuensis (Butler, 1874)
 Leptataspis patagiata Lallemand, 1927
 Leptataspis peracuta Lallemand, 1928
 Leptataspis perakensis Lallemand, 1923
 Leptataspis phiale (Breddin, 1902)
 Leptataspis phialiforme Lallemand, 1922
 Leptataspis philippinensis Schmidt, 1920
 Leptataspis philomele (Breddin, 1903)
 Leptataspis pirollei Lallemand, 1912
 Leptataspis polyxena (Breddin, 1903)
 Leptataspis polyxenia Schmidt, 1910
 Leptataspis postcingulata Jacobi, 1921
 Leptataspis progne (Breddin, 1903)
 Leptataspis proserpinopsis Schmidt, 1911
 Leptataspis quadrinotata Lallemand, 1922
 Leptataspis quinqueguttata Jacobi, 1921
 Leptataspis robinsoni Lallemand, 1928
 Leptataspis rotundata (Walker, 1858)
 Leptataspis royeri Lallemand, 1922
 Leptataspis rubiana (Jacobi, 1905)
 Leptataspis rubrolimbata Lallemand, 1922
 Leptataspis rufimargo (Walker, 1870)
 Leptataspis rufipes (Stål, 1870)
 Leptataspis rugulosa (Walker, 1857)
 Leptataspis rutilans (Butler, 1874)
 Leptataspis sanguinea Lallemand, 1931
 Leptataspis sanguiniflua (Breddin, 1899)
 Leptataspis scabra (Distant, 1900)
 Leptataspis scabrida Schmidt, 1910
 Leptataspis schlaginhaufeni Jacobi, 1921
 Leptataspis selangorensis Lallemand, 1930
 Leptataspis semicincta (Walker, 1851)
 Leptataspis semipardalis (Walker, 1857)
 Leptataspis sempolana Lallemand, 1935
 Leptataspis siamensis (Butler, 1874)
 Leptataspis similis Schmidt, 1911
 Leptataspis specialis Lallemand, 1927
 Leptataspis striata Lallemand, 1922
 Leptataspis sumatrana Schmidt, 1911
 Leptataspis sumbana Schmidt, 1927
 Leptataspis testaceicollis Schmidt, 1911
 Leptataspis toxopei Lallemand & Synave, 1955
 Leptataspis trichinopolis Lallemand, 1922
 Leptataspis trifasciata Lallemand, 1927
 Leptataspis turana Lallemand, 1922
 Leptataspis walkeri Metcalf, 1961

References 

 Schmidt E. 1910 - Neue Gattungen und Arten der Subfamilie Cercopinae Stal, ein Beitrag zur Kenntnis der Cercopiden (Hemiptera-Homoptera). Archiv für Naturgeschichte. Berlin 76: 53-112.

Auchenorrhyncha genera
Cercopidae